Kuijpers or Kuypers is a Dutch surname corresponding to the English Cooper. Variant spellings are Kuipers, Kuiper, and Cuypers.

Notable people with the surname Kuijpers or Kuypers include:
 Eddy Kuijpers (1914–1992), Dutch fencer
 Evy Kuijpers (born 1995), Dutch racing cyclist
 Franciscus Kuijpers  (born 1941), Dutch chess player
 Hans Kuypers (1925–1988), Dutch neuroscientist
 Henk Kuijpers (born 1946), Dutch comics artist
 Jan-Hein Kuijpers (born 1968), Dutch lawyer and columnist
 Jim A. Kuypers, American communications academic
  (1892–1967), Belgian civil servant and author
 Leonard Kuypers (1899–1988), Dutch fencer
 Paul Kuijpers (1939–1971), Dutch agriculture expert
  (born 1945), Dutch conductor and oboist
 Pieter Kuijpers (born 1968), Dutch director, screenwriter and producer
 Rik Kuypers (born 1925), Belgian film director
  (1899–1986), bishop of Paramaribo 1958–1971

References

Dutch-language surnames
Occupational surnames